Jahan Tigh (also Romanized as Jahān Tīgh and Jahāntīgh) is a village in Margan Rural District, in the Central District of Hirmand County, Sistan and Baluchestan Province, Iran. At the 2006 census, its population was 826, broken down in 172 families.

References 

Populated places in Hirmand County